Gerard Bieszczad (born 5 February 1993) is a Polish footballer who plays as a goalkeeper for Stal Rzeszów in the I liga. Besides Poland, he has played in Slovakia.

Club career
Bieszczad began his career at hometown club Igloopol Dębica before moving to Lech Poznań. Subsequently, he was loaned out to Tur Turek, Sandecja Nowy Sącz and Warta Międzychód.

References

External links
 
 

Polish footballers
Polish expatriate footballers
Poland youth international footballers
Lech Poznań players
Sandecja Nowy Sącz players
Tur Turek players
Wisła Kraków players
Bytovia Bytów players
MFK Zemplín Michalovce players
FK Slavoj Trebišov players
Stal Rzeszów players
Slovak Super Liga players
2. Liga (Slovakia) players
Ekstraklasa players
I liga players
II liga players
Polish expatriate sportspeople in Slovakia
Expatriate footballers in Slovakia
1993 births
Living people
People from Dębica
Sportspeople from Podkarpackie Voivodeship
Association football goalkeepers